Qstock is an annual two-day rock festival held at the end of July in Oulu, Finland.
The festival lineup includes some of the biggest names in both domestic and international music scene, regardless of the genre. The first Qstock festival was organised in 2003. The festival has quickly grown into the biggest summer event in northern Finland, with its 30,000 visitors. As of July 2022, Qstock has been sold out nine times in a row. The festival acts as sort of a successor of the former Kuusrock festival which was organised in Oulu from 1970s until early 1990s.

Qstock is organised by Qstock Ltd and the event's official, promotional vehicle is a white/yellow coloured VW Kleinbus from 1965.

Qstock has its own online TV channel called 'QTV' which releases new episodes throughout the Spring, with interviews from each summer's upcoming festival lineup. The full length episodes can be viewed via Qstock Festival's Youtube channel.

Lineup

2003 

1st Qstock was organised in Oulu, 18 – 19 July 2003. The organisers expected the festival to get approximately 2,000 visitors, but eventually the number grew to approximately 7,000 visitors. The lineup included, amongst others; Sentenced, Negative and Radiopuhelimet.

2004 

2nd Qstock was organised in Kuusisaari, Oulu, 23 – 24 July 2004.

The lineup included a.o. Kotiteollisuus, Sentenced and Suburban Tribe. The 2004 event also saw the comeback performance of Brussel Kaupallinen.

2005 

3rd Qstock was organised in Oulu,  29 – 30 July 2005.

The lineup included a.o. Apulanta, CMX, Hidria Spacefolk, Negative, Moses Hazy, The 69 Eyes, The Coffinshakers and Kuolleet Intiaanit.

2006 

4th Qstock was organised in Oulu, 28 – 29 July 2006.

The lineup included Motörhead, Paradise Lost, The Cardigans, Anekdoten, Sonata Arctica, Egotrippi, PMMP, Tiktak, Mokoma, Negative, Poets of the Fall, Tuomari Nurmio, Lemonator, Kemopetrol, Teräsbetoni, Amorphis, Diablo, Poisonblack and Shade Empire.

The festival area also included a huge tent called 'Happiteltta', organised by a local Trank-collective, featuring artists such as Nicole Willis & The Soul Investigators, Modeselektor (D), Thomas Brinkmann (D), Zentex (D), Kiki & Silversurfer, Magyar Posse, Plutonium 74, and I Was a Teenage Satan Worshipper.

In 2006 the festival capacity was significantly increased by bringing the main entrance closer to the city central. The visitor traffic rush on entrances was also decreased by organising ticket > wristband exchange spots in the city central.

2007 

5th Qstock was organised in Oulu, 27 – 28 July 2007.

The lineup included a.o. Turbonegro, The Coffinshakers, The Soundtrack of Our Lives, Sparzanza, Celtic Frost, The Rasmus, Hanoi Rocks, Stam1na, Sonata Arctica, Poets of the Fall, Sunrise Avenue, CMX, Von Hertzen Brothers, Zen Cafe, Maija Vilkkumaa, PMMP, Tarot, Mieskuoro Huutajat and Morley.

2008 

6th Qstock festival was organised in Kuusisaari, Oulu, 25 – 26 July 2008.

The lineup included a.o. Manic Street Preachers, Within Temptation, Dark Tranquility, Poets of the Fall, Ismo Alanko Teholla, Sturm ind Drang, J&J, Kotiteollisuus, 22 Pistepirkko, Scandinavian Music Group, Mokoma, Stam1na, Diablo, Entwine, PMMP, YUP, Amorphis, Aknestik, Leverage, and Seith. The so-called "Jälkikäynti-club" featured the heavy metal band W.A.S.P. The "Happiteltta" featured The Field, 120 Days, Äänijännite, Eero Johannes, Komytea and Artificial Latvamäki.

2009 

7th Qstock festival was organised in Kuusisaari, Oulu, 24 – 25 July 2009.

The lineup included a.o. Pain, Sparzanza, Major Parkinson, Heaven and Hell, Elephant 9, Apulanta, Pete Parkkonen, Happoradio, Maija Vilkkumaa, Haloo Helsinki!, Kotiteollisuus, Radiopuhelimet, Sacred Crucifix, Tuomari Nurmio, PMMP, Op:l Bastards, Amorphis, The Black League, CMX, Egotrippi, The Rasmus, Kauko Röyhkä & Rättö & Lehtisalo, Stam1na, Anna Puu and Cheek.

2010 

8th Qstock festival was organised in Kuusisaari, Oulu, 30 – 31 July 2010.

The lineup included Meshuggah, Raised Fist, Europe, Gösta Berlings Saga, Chisu, Eppu Normaali, Sonata Arctica, Husky Rescue, Eläkeläiset, Ismo Alanko & Teho-osasto, Doom Unit, Samuli Putro, Jenni Vartiainen, Amorphis, Fintelligens, Viikate, J. Karjalainen Polkabilly Rebels, Klamydia, Tuomo, Stam1na, Mokoma and Radiopuhelimet.

2011 

9th Qstock festival was organised in Kuusisaari & Raatti, Oulu, 29 – 30 July 2011.

Lineup on Fri 29: Children of Bodom, Happoradio, Paleface, Petri Nygård, Laura Närhi, CMX, Omnium Gatherum, Barbe-Q-Barbies, Amorphis, Scarified, Radiopuhelimet, Terveet Kädet, Regina, Haloo Helsinki!, Reetta and Sininen Kaappi

Lineup on Sat 30: Twisted Sister, Mustasch, Wold People, The Posies, Jenni Vartiainen, Von Hertzen Brothers, Cheek, Apulanta, Stam1na, Jukka Poika & Sound Explosion Band, Anna Puu, The Mama King, Michael Monroe, Anna Abreu, Antti Tuisku, Jukka Takalo, Stache, 2-7 Miehen trio and Satellite Stories.

2012 

10th Qstock festival was organised in Kuusisaari & Raatti, Oulu, 27 – 28 July 2012.

Lineup on Fri 27: Michael Monroe, Apocalyptica, PMMP, Sonata Arctica, Iiris Vesik, Jippu, Notkea Rotta, French Films, Satan Takes A Holiday, Kotiteollisuus, Klamydia, Paprika Korps, Black City, Radiopuhelimet, Matalat Majat, Madhatter, JVG, Petri Nygård, Haterial, TKU 10, Ruger Hauer, Gracias, Relentless, For the Imperium and Salaseura.

Lineup on Sat 28: Roxette, Arch Enemy, Amaranthe, Apulanta, Chisu, Jukka Poika & Sound Explosion Band, Kauko Röyhkä & Narttu, Reckless Love, Emma Salokoski Ensemble, Stam1na, Sparzanza, Fintelligens, Death Letters, Pariisin Kevät, Viikate, Haloo Helsinki!, Martti Servo ja Napander, Diandra Flores, Sara, Tes La Rok, Kirsi Helena, Solonen, Hebosagil, Olli PA & OPP, Swallow The Sun, Before The Dawn, Satellite Stories, Tunguska Press, Ruudolf ja Karri Koira, Stepa & Are, Väinö Tuonela & Kerettiläiset, Bongo Rock, Kairon; IRSE!, Torttu and Apina.

2013 
11th Qstock festival was organised in Kuusisaari & Raatti, Oulu, 26 – 27 July 2013. The festival was sold out with 30,000 visitors.

Lineup on Fri 26: J. Karjalainen, Krista Siegfrids, Temple Balls, Levon Zoltar, PMMP, Bloodred Hourglass, Julma-Henri x RPK, Kotiteollisuus, First Aid Kit, Pearly Gates, Michael Monroe, Battle Beast, Teflon Brothers, Turmion Kätilöt, The Scenes, Kolmas Nainen, Anna Puu, Shining, Stig & Kullankaivajat, Von Hertzen Brothers, Mariska & Pahat Sudet, Dimi, Sini Sabotage, Within Temptation, Eevil Stöö, DJ Kridlokk & Koksukoo, and Radiopuhelimet.

Lineup on Sat 27: Jonne Aaron, Elämän Jani & Totuuden Todistajat, Antti Tuisku, Eva & Manu, Petri Nygård, Raappana & Sound Explosion Band, Justimus and Nost3 & Protro, ESOM, Cheek, Santa Cruz, Funksons, Mokoma, Satellite Stories, Domovoyd, Jukka Poika & Sound Explosion Band, Rytmihäiriö, Laineen Kasperi & Palava Kaupunki, Disco Ensemble, Laura Närhi, Kalmah, Amorphis, Pää Kii, Inner Circle, Haloo Helsinki!, Fuckface Unstoppable, Mushmouthed Talk, Eppu Normaali, Bombus, Elokuu, Katatonia, Karri Koira, The Magnettes, HIM, Stepa & Are and Wöyh.

2014 

12th Qstock festival was organised in Kuusisaari & Raatti, Oulu, 25 – 26 July 2014. The festival was sold out. Pre-announced festival headliners were Volbeat for Friday 25 and Megadeth for Saturday 26 July.

Lineup on Fri 25: Happoradio, Nopsajalka, Alataajuus-deejiit, Magic Meredith, Erin, Lost Society, Risto, Viikate, Graveyard, Nuoret Marttyyrit, Sonata Arctica, Iisa, Elastinen, Michael Monroe, Scandinavian Music Group, Pummiharmonia, Jenni Vartiainen, Kypck, Gracias & The Globe Band, J. Karjalainen, DJ Q, Sanni, Tuomas Henrikin Jeesuksen Kristuksen Bändi, Kasmir, Juju and Radiopuhelimet.

Lineup on Sat 26: Softengine, Alataajuus-deejiit, Joma, Jukka Poika & Sound Explosion Band, The Blanko, Setä Tamu, Kuningas Pähkinä, Mäkki, Kube, Chebaleba, Samuli Putro, Santa Cruz, Night Lives, Anna Abreu, Wolfheart, Tuomas Kauhanen, Pariisin Kevät, Poisonblack, The Scenes, Haloo Helsinki!, The Stanfields, Brädi, Soilwork, DJ Haus, Redrama, Villi Huhu, Kaija Koo, Profane Omen, JVG, Stam1na, Dj Mala, The 69 Eyes, Blind Channel, Cheek, Bigelf, KC/MD Mafia, Apulanta, The Asteroids Galaxy Tour, Disco Fiasco, Musta Barbaari, Mikael Gabriel and Brother Firetribe.

References

External links
 

Culture in Oulu
Rock festivals in Finland
Tourist attractions in Oulu
Koskikeskus
Music festivals established in 2003
Summer events in Finland